Boulder is a center of media in north-central Colorado. The following is a list of media outlets based in the city.

Print

Newspapers
The Daily Camera is the city's primary newspaper, published daily. Other newspapers published in the city include:
50 Plus Marketplace News, seniors' lifestyle, monthly
Boulder County Business Report, business news, twice monthly
Boulder County Kids, children's entertainment, quarterly
Boulder Weekly, alternative newspaper, weekly
Colorado Daily, five days a week

Magazines 

 Boulder Magazine published 3x/year

Radio
Boulder is a principal city of the Denver-Boulder radio market. In its Fall 2013 ranking of radio markets by population, Arbitron ranked the Denver-Boulder market 19th in the United States. The market includes seven counties in north-central Colorado:  Adams, Arapahoe, Boulder, Broomfield, Denver, Douglas, and Jefferson.

The following is a list of radio stations which broadcast from and/or are licensed to Boulder:

AM

FM

Local listeners can also receive the signal of radio stations broadcasting from nearby communities including Aurora, Denver, Centennial, Greeley, Greenwood Village, Longmont, and Loveland.

Television
Boulder is in the Denver television market. In addition, local viewers can receive the signal of television stations broadcasting from nearby communities including Fort Collins and Greeley.

The following is a list of television stations that broadcast from and/or are licensed to Boulder.

References

Boulder